John Cunningham (18 November 1854 – 20 August 1932) was a New Zealand cricketer. He played one first-class match for Taranaki in 1882/83.

See also
 List of Taranaki representative cricketers

References

External links
 

1854 births
1932 deaths
New Zealand cricketers
Taranaki cricketers
Cricketers from New Plymouth